I Cugini di Campagna ("The Countryside Cousins") is an Italian pop band formed in 1970 in Rome. They are well known for the use of falsetto and for their eccentric look, a cross between glam and kitsch.

Background 
The band achieved some success with its first single, "Il ballo di Peppe", that was launched by the radio-program Alto Gradimento in 1970. In 1973 the band gained more success with the song "Anima mia", then they achieved a series of commercial hits until the early eighties. After a difficult period the band resurfaced in 1997, with a new lineup, thanks to the RAI TV-show Anima mia, whose success lead to the rediscovery of their eponymous song and the band as a whole. 

"Anima mia" was covered by numerous artists, including  ABBA singer Anni-Frid Lyngstad (as "Ett liv i solen", included in her album Frida ensam), Dalida, Bobby Rydell, Claudio Baglioni, Piergiorgio Farina, Gianni Meccia.

Since then Cugini di Campagna have produced a series of albums, containing both re-arranged versions of their earlier hits as well as new material.

On 4 December 2022, it was officially announced their participation in the Sanremo Music Festival 2023. "Lettera 22" was later announced as their entry for the Sanremo Music Festival 2023.

Band Members

Current members 
 Ivano Michetti (1970–present) - guitar
 Silvano Michetti (1970–present) - drums
 Tiziano Leonardi (2012–present) - bass
 Nick Luciani (1994–2014; 2021–present), vocals

Former members 
  (1970–1977) - vocals
 Gianni Fiori (1970–1972) - keyboards
 Giorgio Brandi (1973–1996) - keyboards
 Paul Manners (1978–1985) - vocals
 Marco Occhetti, aka Kim (1986–1994) - vocals
 Luca Storelli (1997–2011) - keyboards
 Daniel Colangeli (2015–2021) - vocals

Discography 
Selected singles
 1970 – "Il ballo di Peppe"
 1972 – "Un letto e una coperta"/"L'uva è nera"
 1973 – "Anima mia"
 1973 – "Solo con te"
 1974 – "Innamorata"
 1974 – "Un'altra donna"
 1975 – "64 anni"
 1975 – "Preghiera"
 1976 – "È lei"
 1977 – "Conchiglia bianca"
 1977 – "Tu sei tu"/"Donna"
 1978 – "Dentro l'anima"
 1979 – "Meravigliosamente"
 1980 – "No tu no"
 1981 – "Valeria"
 1982 – "Uomo mio"
 1985 – "Che cavolo d'amore"
 1998 – "Amor mio"
 2002 – "Vita della mia vita"
 2006 – "Sapessi quanto"
 2011 – "Mi manchi tu"
 2023 – "Lettera 22"

References

External links
Official website
 
Discogs.com

Musical groups established in 1970

Italian pop music groups
Musical groups from Rome